This is a list of palaces and mansions in Somogy County in Hungary.

List of palaces and mansions in Somogy County

See also
 List of palaces and mansions in Hungary
 List of castles in Hungary

Literature
 Zsolt Virág : Magyar Kastélylexikon - Somogy megye kastélyai

References

Somogy County
Houses in Hungary